Esporte Clube Pau Grande is a sports club from Pau Grande, a district of Magé, in Rio de Janeiro. It was founded on August 11, 1908 by workers of a local fabric factory, owned  by Englishmen. E.C. Pau Grande is famous for being the first football club of the Brazilian football star Garrincha.

Association football clubs established in 1908
Football clubs in Rio de Janeiro (state)
Esporte Clube Pau Grande